Events in the year 1804 in Norway.

Incumbents
Monarch: Christian VII

Events
6 January - Mathias Bonsach Krogh became the first Bishop of the Diocese of Hålogaland.
 Trondhjems amt was split into two, with the northern part becoming Nordre Trondhjems amt and the southern part becoming Søndre Trondhjems amt.
The first Agdenes Lighthouse was established.

Arts and literature

Births

29 May – Søren Wilhelm Thorne, priest and politician (d. 1878)
6 June – Georg Wallace, politician (d. 1890)
5 July – Anton Theodor Harris, politician (d. 1866)
9 September - Kristoffer Nilsen Svartbækken Grindalen, criminal, killer and thief (d. 1876).
17 September – Hans Biørn Wenneberg, politician (d. 1878)
19 September – Elling Eielsen, minister and Lutheran Church leader in America (d.1883)
20 September – Christopher Henrik Holfeldt Tostrup, timber merchant and land-owner (d. 1881)
12 October – Eskild Bruun, barrister, judge and businessman (d. 1877).
4 November – Peder Balke, painter (d. 1887)
8 November – Hans Eleonardus Møller, politician and businessperson (d.1867)
21 November – Henrik Heftye, businessman and philanthropist (d. 1864)
25 November – Jens Matthias Pram Kaurin, professor of theology, biblical translator, and Lutheran priest (d. 1863).
19 December – Carl Siegfried Bonnevie, naval officer (d. 1856)

Full date unknown
Paulus Flood, merchant and politician (d.1847)
Jens Christian Folkman Schaanning, politician
Jacob Worm Skjelderup, politician and Minister (d.1863)
Hans Biørn Wenneberg, politician

Deaths
17 March – Hans Tank, skipper, merchant and endowment founder (b. 1742).
29 June – Halvor Blinderen, farmer (born 1733).
4 December – Jens Holmboe, bailiff (b. 1752)

Full date unknown
Kristofer Sjursson Hjeltnes, farmer and businessperson (b.1730)

See also

References